The Red Dove is a 1982 thriller novel by the British writer Derek Lambert.

References

Bibliography
 Nancy-Stephanie Stone. A Reader's Guide to the Spy and Thriller Novel. G.K. Hall, 1997.

1982 British novels
Novels by Derek Lambert
British thriller novels
Sphere Books books